Anthony Pearson may refer to:

Anthony Pearson (martyr) (died 1543), English Protestant martyr, executed for heresy
Anthony Pearson (Quaker) (1628–  1670), English Quaker
Tony Pearson (cricketer) (born 1941), former English cricketer
Tony Pearson (bodybuilder) (born 1957), American bodybuilding champion